A faucet (or "tap" or "spigot") is a valve controlling the release of a liquid or gas.

Faucet may also refer to:
 Bitcoin faucet, a bitcoin dispenser
 Bithynia tentaculata, or faucet snail, a species of freshwater snail

See also
Faucet Inn, a British pub company